The circles of Apollonius are any of several sets of circles associated with Apollonius of Perga, a renowned Greek geometer.  Most of these circles are found in  planar Euclidean geometry, but analogs have been defined on other surfaces; for example, counterparts on the surface of a sphere can be defined through stereographic projection.

The main uses of this term are fivefold:

 Apollonius showed that a circle can be defined as the set of points in a plane that have a specified ratio of distances to two fixed points, known as foci.  This Apollonian circle is the basis of the Apollonius pursuit problem.  It is a particular case of the first family described in #2.
 The Apollonian circles are two families of mutually orthogonal circles.  The first family consists of the circles with all possible distance ratios to two fixed foci (the same circles as in #1), whereas the second family consists of all possible circles that pass through both foci.  These circles form the basis of bipolar coordinates.
 The circles of Apollonius of a triangle are three circles, each of which passes through one vertex of the triangle and maintains a constant ratio of distances to the other two.  The isodynamic points and Lemoine line of a triangle can be solved using these circles of Apollonius.
 Apollonius' problem is to construct circles that are simultaneously tangent to three specified circles.  The solutions to this problem are sometimes called the circles of Apollonius.
 The Apollonian gasket—one of the first fractals ever described—is a set of mutually tangent circles, formed by solving Apollonius' problem iteratively.

Apollonius' definition of a circle

A circle is usually defined as the set of points P at a given distance r (the circle's radius) from a given point (the circle's center).  However, there are other, equivalent definitions of a circle.  Apollonius discovered that a circle could be defined as the set of points P that have a given ratio of distances k =  to two given points (labeled A and B in Figure 1).  These two points are sometimes called the foci.

Proof using vectors in Euclidean spaces
Let d, d be non-equal positive real numbers.
Let C be the internal division point of AB in the ratio d : d and D the external division point of AB in the same ratio, d : d.

Then,

Therefore, the point P is on the circle which has the diameter CD.

Proof using the angle bisector theorem

By the definition

Next take the other point  on the extended line  that satisfies the ratio. So

Also take some other point  anywhere on the extended line . Also by the Angle bisector theorem the line  bisects the exterior angle . Hence by Thales's theorem  lies on the circle which has  as a diameter.

Apollonius pursuit problem

The Apollonius pursuit problem is one of finding whether a ship leaving from one point A at speed vA will intercept another ship leaving a different point B at speed vB.  The minimum time in interception of the two ships is calculated by means of straight-line paths. If the ships' speeds are held constant, their speed ratio is defined by μ. If both ships collide or meet at a future point, I, then the distances of each are related by the equation:

Squaring both sides, we obtain:

Expanding:

Further expansion:

Bringing to the left-hand side:

Factoring:

Dividing by  :

Completing the square:

Bring non-squared terms to the right-hand side:

Then:

Therefore, the point must lie on a circle as defined by Apollonius, with their starting points as the foci.

Circles sharing a radical axis

The circles defined by the Apollonian pursuit problem for the same two points A and B, but with varying ratios of the two speeds, are disjoint from each other and form a continuous family that cover the entire plane; this family of circles is known as a hyperbolic pencil. Another family of circles, the circles that pass through both A and B, are also called a pencil, or more specifically an elliptic pencil. These two pencils of Apollonian circles intersect each other at right angles and form the basis of the bipolar coordinate system. Within each pencil, any two circles have the same radical axis; the two radical axes of the two pencils are perpendicular, and the centers of the circles from one pencil lie on the radical axis of the other pencil.

Solutions to Apollonius' problem

In Euclidean plane geometry, Apollonius's problem is to construct circles that are tangent to three given circles in a plane.

Three given circles generically have eight different circles that are tangent to them  and each solution circle encloses or excludes the three given circles in a different way: in each solution, a different subset of the three circles is enclosed.

Apollonian gasket

By solving Apollonius' problem repeatedly to find the inscribed circle, the interstices between mutually tangential circles can be filled arbitrarily finely, forming an Apollonian gasket, also known as a Leibniz packing or an Apollonian packing.  This gasket is a fractal, being self-similar and having a dimension d that is not known exactly but is roughly 1.3, which is higher than that of a regular (or rectifiable) curve (d = 1) but less than that of a plane (d = 2).  The Apollonian gasket was first described by Gottfried Leibniz in the 17th century, and is a curved precursor of the 20th-century Sierpiński triangle.  The Apollonian gasket also has deep connections to other fields of mathematics; for example, it is the limit set of Kleinian groups; see also Circle packing theorem.

Isodynamic points of a triangle
The circles of Apollonius may also denote three special circles  defined by an arbitrary triangle . Apollonius' definition of the circle above).

All three circles intersect the circumcircle of the triangle orthogonally. The line connecting these common intersection points is the radical axis for all three circles. The two isodynamic points are inverses of each other relative to the circumcircle of the triangle.

The centers of these three circles fall on a single line (the Lemoine line).  This line is perpendicular to the radical axis, which is the line determined by the isodynamic points.

See also

Apollonius point
Ellipse

References

Bibliography
 Ogilvy, C.S. (1990) Excursions in Geometry, Dover. .
 Johnson, R.A. (1960) Advanced Euclidean Geometry, Dover.

Apollonius